Uzturre is a modest mountain in Gipuzkoa, Basque Country of Spain.

Mountains of the Basque Country (autonomous community)